Encounters in the Phoenix Quadrant is a 1980 role-playing game supplement for Traveller published by Group One.

Contents
Encounters in the Phoenix Quadrant is a play aid for Traveller that describes three new ship types - a deep space miner, a Springer freighter, and an exploration ship - and their crews.

Publication history
Encounters in the Phoenix Quadrant was published in 1980 by Group One as a 16-page book.

Reception
William A. Barton reviewed Encounters in the Phoenix Quadrant in The Space Gamer No. 31. Barton commented that "Overall, the wealth of detailed information on ships and their crews makes Encounters in the Phoenix Quadrant a worthwhile purchase for almost any Traveller player or referee. If, however, you prefer to create your own encounter situations from scratch and have no use for even so much as a frame on which to hang your ideas, you'd be best advised to leave this aid on the shelves."

References

Role-playing game supplements introduced in 1980
Traveller (role-playing game) supplements